Southside Technical Center is a public high school in Lexington, Kentucky, within the Fayette County Public School System.

External links and references
 Southside Technical Center

Public high schools in Kentucky
Schools in Lexington, Kentucky